Uciechów may refer to the following places in Poland:
Uciechów, Lower Silesian Voivodeship (south-west Poland)
Uciechów, Greater Poland Voivodeship (west-central Poland)